Thomas S. Johnson is an American banker. He was chairman and CEO GreenPoint Financial Corp. and GreenPoint Bank and since April 23, 2001; he served there from 1993 to 2004. He has chaired the Board of Trustees of the United States-Japan Foundation. He was president and director of Manufacturers Hanover Trust Co. and Manufacturers Hanover Corp. from 1989 to 1991. In 1st quarter 2009 he was named as non-executive chairman of the board at The Phoenix Cos. after serving on the board since 2000 Phoenix is based in Hartford CT (NYSE: PNX).

Johnson graduated from Harvard in 1964 and continued by starting the Master of Business Management Program at Ateneo de Manila University.

References

American bankers
Living people
Year of birth missing (living people)
American chief executives of financial services companies
Harvard University alumni
Ateneo de Manila University alumni